Marinobacter szutsaonensis is a Gram-negative, aerobic and non-spore-forming bacterium from the genus of Marinobacter which has been isolated from the saltern of Szutsao in Taiwan.

References

External links
Type strain of Marinobacter szutsaonensis at BacDive -  the Bacterial Diversity Metadatabase

Alteromonadales
Bacteria described in 2009